Stefan Mücke (born 22 November 1981) is a German professional racing driver.

Racing career
Born in Berlin, Mücke started his racing career in 1998, when he won the Formula BMW ADAC series, with his father's Mücke Motorsport team, also making their debut. He competed in German Formula Three for his father's team for the next three years, before moving to the Deutsche Tourenwagen Masters for 2002. He raced Mercedes for Team Rosberg, Persson Motorsport and Mücke Motorsport in his four years in the series.

In 2007, Mücke moved into sports car racing, in the FIA GT Championship for the AllInkl.com team in a Lamborghini Murciélago R-GT, and in the Le Mans Series and the 24 Hours of Le Mans for Charouz Racing Systems in their Lola. He continued to race with Charouz in 2008. In 2009 he competed at the Le Mans Series for Aston Martin Racing. He recorded three consecutive top-ten finishes in the LMP1 class at Le Mans.

On 5 June 2011 Mücke was involved in incident with Richard Westbrook during FIA GT1 World Championship race at Silverstone. First, Westbrook hit Mücke who spun as a result, while Westbrook damaged his own car. Mücke continued and clipped ahead of Westbrook who was driving down Hangar Straight. Both cars were wrecked as a result, and were out of the race. Mücke received 10-place grid penalty for the next race and he was also reported to DMSB to have his licence withdrawn.

Mücke again had his aggressive driving style questioned after at least two incidents in the 2015 Liqui-Moly Bathurst 12 Hour. Both involved collisions with Bentleys on the difficult Mount Panorama Circuit. The first took out David Brabham at 'The Cutting', the second on the last corner of the last lap forced Matt Bell wide, depriving the latter of a podium place. "I think the guy (Mücke) needs a bit of a talking to." said Bell's co-driver Guy Smith.

For 2012, Mücke will compete in the FIA World Endurance Championship with Aston Martin Racing in a GTE-Pro class Aston Martin Vantage.

In the 80th, edition of the 24 Hours of Le Mans in 2012, Mücke and the Aston Martin Racing got the third place in the GTE-Pro class along with his co-drivers the Mexican Adrián Fernández and the British Darren Turner, their Aston Martin Vantage 4.5 L-V8 covered a total of 332 laps (2,811.65 miles), in the Circuit de la Sarthe without failure or serious mechanical problems. Also the team achieved the fastest lap of the category with 3 minutes and 54.928 seconds.

In 2016, Stefan joined Ford Chip Ganassi Racing UK's two-car FIA World Endurance Championship LMGTE Pro effort after eight seasons with Aston Martin.

Racing record

Complete Deutsche Tourenwagen Masters results
(key) (Races in bold indicate pole position) (Races in italics indicate fastest lap)

1 – Shanghai was a non-championship round.
† — Retired, but was classified as he completed 90% of the winner's race distance.

Complete 24 Hours of Le Mans results

Complete GT1 World Championship results

Complete FIA World Endurance Championship results
(key) (Races in bold indicate pole position; races in
italics indicate fastest lap)

References

External links
 
 

1981 births
Living people
Sportspeople from Berlin
German racing drivers
Formula BMW ADAC drivers
German Formula Three Championship drivers
Deutsche Tourenwagen Masters drivers
American Le Mans Series drivers
FIA GT Championship drivers
24 Hours of Le Mans drivers
European Le Mans Series drivers
FIA GT1 World Championship drivers
FIA World Endurance Championship drivers
Blancpain Endurance Series drivers
24 Hours of Daytona drivers
WeatherTech SportsCar Championship drivers
24 Hours of Spa drivers
Asian Le Mans Series drivers
24H Series drivers
Aston Martin Racing drivers
Mücke Motorsport drivers
Team Rosberg drivers
Charouz Racing System drivers
Chip Ganassi Racing drivers
Mercedes-AMG Motorsport drivers
Multimatic Motorsports drivers
Jota Sport drivers
Nürburgring 24 Hours drivers
Craft-Bamboo Racing drivers